Macebuh Chinonyerem is a Nigerian politician and member of the 4th and 5th National Assemblies representing Ukwa East/Ukwa West constituency of Abia State under the umbrella of the People's Democratic Party. He went on to contest for a seat to represent Abia South Senatorial district under the flagship of the All Progressives Congress (APC) at the 2011 general elections.

See also
Nigerian National Assembly delegation from Abia

References

People from Abia State
Living people
Igbo politicians
Peoples Democratic Party members of the House of Representatives (Nigeria)
Year of birth missing (living people)